Wennington can refer to:
Wennington, Cambridgeshire, England
Wennington, Lancashire, England
Wennington, London, England
Wennington School, England
Bill Wennington (born 1963), Canadian former NBA basketball player